Centrolabrus melanocercus, the black-tailed wrasse, is a species of marine ray-finned fish from the wrasse family Labridae which is found in the Mediterranean Sea and the Sea of Marmara. This species was formally described in 1810 as Lutjanus melanocercus by Antoine Risso with the type locality given as Saint Hospice near Villefranche-sur-Mer on the Mediterranean coast of France. This species was regarded as a member of the genus Symphodus but meristic and behavioural data placed it closer to the rock cook than the sexually dimorphic paternal nesting fishes in Symphodus. It can reach  in total length, though most do not exceed .

References

melanocercus
Fish of the Mediterranean Sea
Fish described in 1810
Taxa named by Antoine Risso
Taxobox binomials not recognized by IUCN